Day of Admittance on Personal Matters is a 1974 Soviet drama film directed by Solomon Shuster.

Plot 
The head of the trust was able to eliminate the accident that occurred in one area. But this victory was a defeat for him.

Cast 
 Anatoly Papanov		
 Oleg Zhakov
 Zinaida Sharko
 Yuri Komarov
 Vladimir Zamanskiy
 Oleg Basilashvili		
 Lyudmila Maksakova
 Mikhail Khizhnyakov
 Ivan Solovyov
 Georgiy Burkov

References

External links 
 

1974 films
1970s Russian-language films
Soviet drama films
1974 drama films